The City of Belmont is a local government area in the inner eastern suburbs of the Western Australian capital city of Perth, located about  east of Perth's central business district on the south bank of the Swan River. The City of Belmont is a member of the Eastern Metropolitan Regional Council

Belmont contains Perth's domestic and international airports  which account for 33.7% of the City of Belmont's land area.

History
The Belmont Road District was created on 2 December 1898. On 4 October 1907, it was renamed Belmont Park. From 1906 until 1909, Burswood Island was part of the district.

On 1 July 1961, the Belmont Park Road District became the Shire of Belmont following the enactment of the Local Government Act 1960. On 17 February 1979 it attained city status.

Ascot and Belmont are suburbs long associated with horses, being close to the race tracks (see Ascot Racecourse and Belmont Park). Until 1956 the Belmont Spur Railway linked Bayswater on the Perth to Midland line to the Ascot race track.

Wards
The City is divided into three wards: East Ward, West Ward and South Ward. Each ward has three councillors. The Mayor and Deputy Mayor are elected from among the councillors. Elections are held on the third Saturday in October every odd year, with councillors elected to four year terms. Approximately half of all positions are up for election at each election.

Political parties do not typically endorse candidates in local government in Western Australia. However, elected members are required to disclose membership of any political party.

Suburbs
The suburbs of the City of Belmont with population and size figures based on the most recent Australian census:

( * indicates suburb partially located within City)

Population

Mayors

Sister cities
 Adachi-ku, Tokyo, Japan  1 October 1984

Heritage-listed places

As of 2023, 110 places are heritage-listed in the City of Belmont, of which seven are on the State Register of Heritage Places, among them the Garratt Road Bridge.

References

External links
 

 
Belmont